Dijon Lynn Thompson (born February 23, 1983)  is an American former professional basketball player who played briefly in the National Basketball Association (NBA). While he played mainly at the shooting guard position in his early career, he also played as a small forward during his European years.

College
Thompson was a standout at the University of California, Los Angeles (UCLA), having an all-time scoring average of 15.6 points per game including 18.4 as a junior. He scored a career-high 39 points against Arizona State on February 10, 2005.

Thompson declared for the NBA draft after the conclusion of his junior year, but withdrew to return for his senior season. That year he led the Bruins to the NCAA Tournament after a two-year absence.

NBA
Thompson was chosen by the New York Knicks in the second round of the 2005 NBA draft (54th pick overall). Soon afterward he was traded along with forward-center Kurt Thomas to the Phoenix Suns, in exchange for guard Quentin Richardson, the draft rights to guard Nate Robinson and cash considerations.

On November 4, 2005 the Suns assigned him to the Albuquerque Thunderbirds of the NBA D-League where he averaged 17.7 points and 7.7 rebounds in three games. The Suns made him the first player of the season recalled from the D-League on November 26, after Leandro Barbosa suffered a knee injury.

On March 10, 2006, Thompson underwent microfracture surgery on his right knee, causing him to sit out the rest of the season. By June 23, it was announced that the Suns were not picking up Thompson's player-option for his second season making him a free-agent. 

On October 2, 2006, the Golden State Warriors invited Thompson to their training camp, however, he was cut by the team just a week later on October 11.

On November 27, 2006, Thompson was reacquired by the Albuquerque Thunderbirds and made an immediate impact by averaging 20.8 points and 9.8 rebounds during his first five games. On December 11, Thompson was named the D-League Performer of the Week.

On January 6, 2007, Thompson was signed to a 10-day contract by the Atlanta Hawks while forward Josh Smith recovered from a hernia operation. The Hawks renewed for a second 10-day contract, on January 16, with Thompson averaging 2.8 points, 1.3 rebounds, and 8.3 minutes in six games. Upon his return to the D-League, Thompson scored 14 points in the 2007 NBA D-League All-Star Game in Las Vegas, Nevada on February 19, 2007. He finished the year leading the Thunderbirds franchise to a playoff berth, though, they lost in the first round.

Thompson was named All-NBA Development League Honorable Mention Team for the 2006-07 season.

European career
On July 27, 2007, Thompson signed a one-year contract with Alba Berlin. ALBA and Thompson agreed to part ways in May 2008.

On June 10, 2008, Thompson signed a contract with Azovmash Mariupol.

On September 4, 2009, Thompson signed a 2-year contract with Hapoel Jerusalem.

He played the 2010-11 season for Spartak Saint Petersburg in the Russian Professional Basketball League.

In July 2011 he signed a one-year contract with ASVEL Lyon-Villeurbanne in France.

In September 2012, he signed with Nizhny Novgorod of the Russian Professional Basketball League. He was named to the All-EuroCup First Team in 2014.

On February 17, 2015, Thompson signed a half-year contract with Hapoel Tel Aviv.

On June 22, 2016, Thompson signed a one-year contract with AEL Larnaca in Cyprus.

References

External links

1983 births
Living people
21st-century African-American sportspeople
AEK Larnaca B.C. players
African-American basketball players
Alba Berlin players
Albuquerque Thunderbirds players
American expatriate basketball people in Argentina
American expatriate basketball people in Cyprus
American expatriate basketball people in France
American expatriate basketball people in Germany
American expatriate basketball people in Israel
American expatriate basketball people in Japan
American expatriate basketball people in Lithuania
American expatriate basketball people in Russia
American expatriate basketball people in Ukraine
American expatriate basketball people in Vietnam
American men's basketball players
ASVEL Basket players
Atlanta Hawks players
Basketball players from Los Angeles
BC Azovmash players
BC Nizhny Novgorod players
BC Spartak Saint Petersburg players
Big3 players
Ferro Carril Oeste basketball players
Hapoel Jerusalem B.C. players
Israeli Basketball Premier League players
Levanga Hokkaido players
New York Knicks draft picks
Phoenix Suns players
Saigon Heat players
Shooting guards
Small forwards
UCLA Bruins men's basketball players
20th-century African-American people
American men's 3x3 basketball players